The Texas Rangers 2001 season involved the Rangers finishing 4th in the American League West with a record of 73 wins and 89 losses. Despite the team's batting leading the league in home runs and finishing second in on-base percentage and OPS, the team's pitching was historically poor; the team combined for an ERA of 5.71 (a franchise-worst mark), and led the league in hits allowed, earned runs surrendered, and total runs surrendered. Their 913 earned runs allowed would also be a franchise-worst, and out of all pitchers that recorded at least 75 innings, none had an ERA below 4.45.

Offseason
November 17, 2000: Aaron Harang was traded by the Texas Rangers with Ryan Cullen (minors) to the Oakland Athletics for Randy Velarde.
December 10, 2000: Ken Caminiti was signed as a free agent with the Texas Rangers.
January 26, 2001 – Alex Rodriguez signed with the Texas Rangers, who had fallen to last in their division in 2000.  The contract he signed is the most lucrative contract in sports history:  a 10-year deal worth $252 million.  The deal is worth $63 million more than the second-richest baseball deal.

Regular season

Opening Day Starters
Iván Rodríguez, C
Rafael Palmeiro, 1B
Randy Velarde, 2B
Ken Caminiti, 3B
Alex Rodriguez, SS
Rusty Greer, LF
Bo Porter, CF
Rubén Mateo, RF
Andrés Galarraga, DH
Rick Helling, RHP

Season Summary
June 8, 2001 – The first interleague game between the Houston Astros and the Texas Rangers took place at The Ballpark at Arlington. The rivalry would be known as the Lone Star Series. The Astros won the game by a score of 5-4. The team that would win the most games between the two in a season would be awarded the Silver Boot.

Season standings

Record vs. opponents

Transactions
June 5, 2001: Mark Teixeira was drafted by the Texas Rangers in the 1st round (5th pick) of the 2001 amateur draft. Player signed August 24, 2001.
June 12, 2001: Justin Duchscherer was traded by the Boston Red Sox to the Texas Rangers for Doug Mirabelli.
July 2, 2001: Ken Caminiti was released by the Texas Rangers.
July 24, 2001: Andrés Galarraga was traded by the Texas Rangers to the San Francisco Giants for Todd Ozias (minors), Chris Magruder and Erasmo Ramirez.
August 31, 2001: Randy Velarde was traded by the Texas Rangers to the New York Yankees for players to be named later. The New York Yankees sent Randy Flores (October 12, 2001) and Rosman García (October 11, 2001) to the Texas Rangers to complete the trade.

Roster

Alex Rodriguez
Alex Rodriguez's power hitting numbers improved with his move to Texas.  In his first season with the Rangers, Alex produced one of the top offensive seasons ever for a shortstop, leading the American League with 52 HR, 133 runs scored, and 393 total bases.  He became the first player since 1932 with 50 homers and 200 hits in a season, just the third shortstop to ever lead his league in homers, and was just the second AL player in the last 34 seasons (beginning 1968) to lead the league in runs, homers, and total bases; his total base figure is the most ever for a major league shortstop.  His 52 homers made him the sixth youngest to ever reach 50 homers and were the highest total ever by a shortstop, surpassing Ernie Banks' mark of 47 in 1958, and also the most ever for an infielder other than a first baseman, breaking Phillies 3B Mike Schmidt's record of 48 in 1980.

It was his 5th 30-homer campaign, tying Banks for most ever by a shortstop.  He also tied for the league lead in extra base hits (87) and ranked 3rd in RBI (135) and slugging (.622).  He was also among the AL leaders in hits (4th, 201), average (7th, .318), and on-base percentage (8th, .399).  He established Rangers club records for homers, runs, total bases, and hit by pitches, had the 2nd most extra base hits, and the 4th highest RBI total.  He led the club in runs, hits, doubles (34), homers, RBI, slugging, and on-base percentage and was 2nd in walks (75), stolen bases (18), and game-winning RBI (14) while posting career highs for homers, RBI, and total bases.  Rodriguez started 161 games at shortstop and one as the DH, the only major league player to start all of his team's games in 2001.

Player stats

Batting

Starters by position
Note: Pos = Position; G = Games played; AB = At bats; H = Hits; Avg. = Batting average; HR = Home runs; RBI = Runs batted in

Other batters
Note: G = Games played; AB = At bats; H = Hits; Avg. = Batting average; HR = Home runs; RBI = Runs batted in

Pitching

Starting pitchers
Note: G = Games pitched; IP = Innings pitched; W = Wins; L = Losses; ERA = Earned run average; SO = Strikeouts

Other pitchers
Note: G = Games pitched; IP = Innings pitched; W = Wins; L = Losses; ERA = Earned run average; SO = Strikeouts

Relief pitchers
Note: G = Games pitched; W = Wins; L = Losses; SV = Saves; ERA = Earned run average; SO = Strikeouts

Awards and honors
Alex Rodriguez, Hank Aaron Award
Alex Rodriguez, A.L. Home Run Champ
Alex Rodriguez, Silver Slugger Award
Iván Rodríguez, C, Gold Glove
Rubén Sierra, Comeback Player of The Year
All-Star Game

Farm system

References

2001 Texas Rangers team page at Baseball Reference
2001 Texas Rangers team page at www.baseball-almanac.com

Texas Rangers seasons
Range
Texas Rangers